Ludwig Elsholtz (1805-1850), a German painter of genre subjects and battles, born at Berlin, studied in the Academy of his native city, and afterwards in the studio of Franz Krüger, the painter of horses. His best work is The Battle of Leipsic, painted in 1833, and now in the possession of the German Emperor. He died at Berlin in 1850. In the Berlin National Gallery is The Beginning of the Fight, dated 1834.

See also
 List of German painters

References

 

1805 births
1850 deaths
19th-century German painters
19th-century German male artists
German male painters
Artists from Berlin
Prussian Academy of Arts alumni